Attila Petschauer (December 14, 1904 – January 30, 1943) was a Hungarian Olympic champion sabre fencer of Jewish heritage.

Fencing career

Petschauer was born in Budapest, and was Jewish.

He fenced first at a salle in Budapest opened in 1885 by Jewish maestro Károly Fodor (Mózes Freyberger) from the age of 8 to the age of 20, and then trained at Nemzeti Vivó Club (NVC) which was established by the Zionist lawyer Marcell Hajdu. He won four Hungarian National Youth Championships.

He was a member of the Hungarian fencing team in the 1928 and 1932 Olympics.  Petschauer was regarded throughout the late 1920s and early 1930s as one of the world's top fencers. Between 1925 and 1931, at the saber world championships he was three times a silver medalist and three times a bronze medalist.

Olympic career
In Amsterdam in 1928 at the age of 23 he was part of the gold medal-winning Hungarian team in sabre, winning all 20 of his competition matches. In the individual sabre competition, Petschauer won the silver medal.

In the 1932 Summer Olympics in Los Angeles, Petschauer was again part of the champion Hungarian sabre team.  The Hungarians won the gold medal in team sabre, and Petschauer finished 5th in individual sabre.

Murder
Petschauer was arrested by the Nazis in 1943 and sent to a forced labor camp in Davidovka, Ukraine.

Some claimed that Petschauer was tortured and murdered under orders of a Hungarian officer, a fellow former Hungarian Olympian named Kálmán Cseh, during his service in a Hungarian-Jewish Forced Labor Battalion.  A fellow inmate, Olympic champion wrestler Károly Kárpáti, recalled: “The guards shouted: ‘You, Olympic fencing medal winner . . . let’s see how you can climb trees.’ It was midwinter and bitter cold, but they ordered him to undress, then climb a tree. The amused guards ordered him to crow like a rooster, and sprayed him with water. Frozen from the water, he died shortly after.”

A fictionalized account of his life and death were dramatised in the 1999 film Sunshine, starring Ralph Fiennes.

Recent research by historians Csaba B. Stenge and Krisztián Ungváry show that according to the records of the Hungarian Royal Army, Petschauer died of typhus in a Soviet POW camp.

Hall of Fame
He was inducted into the International Jewish Sports Hall of Fame in 1985.

Memorial event
The Attila Petschauer Event was begun in 1995 as a memorial to Petschauer by his relative, Dr. Richard Markowitz. It is known across the United States as one of the top sabre events.

See also
List of select Jewish fencers

References

External links
Olympic record
Jewish Sports Legends bio
Holocaust Museum bio

1904 births
1943 deaths
Deaths from hypothermia
Hungarian male sabre fencers
Jewish Hungarian sportspeople
Jewish male sabre fencers
Olympic fencers of Hungary
Olympic gold medalists for Hungary
Olympic silver medalists for Hungary
Olympic medalists in fencing
Fencers at the 1928 Summer Olympics
Fencers at the 1932 Summer Olympics
People condemned by Nazi courts
Hungarian civilians killed in World War II
International Jewish Sports Hall of Fame inductees
Medalists at the 1928 Summer Olympics
Medalists at the 1932 Summer Olympics
Hungarian people who died in Nazi concentration camps
People who died in Davidovka concentration camp
Hungarian Jews who died in the Holocaust
Hungarian World War II forced labourers
Fencers from Budapest